Fagerum is a small village on Öland. It belongs to the municipality of Borgholm.

Populated places in Borgholm Municipality